Harold William Kottman (August 22, 1922 – November 30, 2004) was an American professional basketball player and coach.

A 6'8" center from Culver-Stockton College, Kottman played one season (1946–47) in the Basketball Association of America as a member of the Boston Celtics. He averaged 3.1 points in 53 games.

After his retirement from playing in 1948, Kottman returned to his home state of Missouri and coached the basketball team at Glasgow High School. He worked as a teacher in Centralia and Center, and became the superintendent of schools in Hale.

BAA career statistics

Regular season

References

External links

1922 births
2004 deaths
American men's basketball players
Basketball players from Missouri
Boston Celtics players
Centers (basketball)
Culver–Stockton Wildcats men's basketball players
People from Chariton County, Missouri
Professional Basketball League of America players